The Duty to Remain Silent (German: Die Pflicht zu schweigen) is a 1928 German silent drama film directed by Carl Wilhelm and starring Marcella Albani, Vivian Gibson, Angelo Ferrari. It was based on a novel by Friedrich Werner van Oestéren. The film's art direction was by Max Heilbronner. It premiered on 8 February 1928.

Cast
 Marcella Albani as Maria Harp 
 Vivian Gibson as Edith, ihre Schwester 
 Angelo Ferrari as Robert Harp 
 Charlotte Susa as Eva Devin, seine Geliebte 
 Julia Serda as Frau Jorin 
 Camilla von Hollay as Emmy, ihre Tochter 
 Jack Trevor as Robert, ihr Sohn 
 Gustav Fröhlich as Gerhard, ihr Sohn 
 Kurt Gerron as Iwan Daniloff 
 Mary Kid as Hilde Ronk 
 Bruno Kastner as Dr. Garonder 
 Ellen Plessow as Frau von Storch 
 Paul Samson-Körner as Jack 
 Sophie Pagay as Die Wirtschafterin 
 Heinrich Gotho as Der Diener

References

Bibliography
 Grange, William. Cultural Chronicle of the Weimar Republic. Scarecrow Press, 2008.

External links

1928 films
1928 drama films
Films of the Weimar Republic
German silent feature films
German drama films
Films directed by Carl Wilhelm
Films based on German novels
Films scored by Paul Dessau
German black-and-white films
Silent drama films
1920s German films
1920s German-language films